Megadytes is a genus of diving beetles in the family Dytiscidae. They are found in slow-moving or static freshwater habitats throughout most of the Neotropics, ranging from Florida and Mexico, through the West Indies and Central America, to South America as far south as central Argentina.

Species
Megadytes contains the following 21 species in 4 subgenera:

Subgenus Bifurcitus:
 †Megadytes ducalis Sharp, 1882
 Megadytes lherminieri (Guérin-Méneville, 1829)
 Megadytes magnus Trémouilles & Bachmann, 1980
Subgenus Megadytes:
 Megadytes carcharias Griffini, 1895
 Megadytes ecuadorius Zimmermann, 1919
 Megadytes flohri Sharp, 1882
 Megadytes fraternus Sharp, 1882
 Megadytes guayanensis (Wilke, 1920)
 Megadytes guignoti Mouchamps, 1957
 Megadytes laevigatus (Olivier, 1795)
 Megadytes latus (Fabricius, 1801)
 Megadytes marginithorax (Perty, 1830)
 Megadytes steinheili (Wehncke, 1876)
Subgenus Paramegadytes:
 Megadytes australis (Germain, 1854)
 Megadytes glaucus (Brullé, 1837)
Subgenus Trifurcitus:
 Megadytes aubei (Wilke, 1920)
 Megadytes aubei meridionalis Mouchamps, 1957
 Megadytes fallax (Aubé, 1838)
 Megadytes gravidus Sharp, 1882
 Megadytes obesus Sharp, 1882
 Megadytes perplexus Sharp, 1882
 Megadytes robustus (Aubé, 1838)
The subgenus and status of these two species are unknown:
 Megadytes costalis (Fabricius, 1775)
 Megadytes obovatus (Kirby, 1826)

References

Dytiscidae genera
Taxonomy articles created by Polbot